Mother's Daughter and Other Songs is the debut album by Tunng, released in 2005. The track "Tale from Black" featured at number 37 in the 2004 Festive Fifty.

Track listing
 "Mother's Daughter" – 3:24
 "People Folk" – 4:09
 "Out the Window with the Window" – 3:20
 "Beautiful and Light" – 4:11
 "Tale from Black" – 5:35
 "Song of the Sea" – 3:54
 "Kinky Vans" – 5:11
 "Fair Doreen" – 1:43
 "Code Breaker" – 3:09
 "Surprise Me 44" – 5:08

References

2005 debut albums
Tunng albums
Static Caravan Recordings albums